Pierre Matisse (June 13, 1900 – August 10, 1989) was a French-American art dealer active in New York City. He was the youngest child of French painter Henri Matisse.

Background and early years
Pierre Matisse was born in Bohain-en-Vermandois on June 13, 1900. He exhibited an early interest in the art market, and took a job at the prestigious Galerie Barbazanges-Hodebert in Paris. In 1924, Pierre settled in New York, where he began a distinguished career of 65 years as an art dealer.

Pierre Matisse Gallery
In 1931, Matisse opened his own gallery in the Fuller Building at 41 East 57th Street in New York City. The Pierre Matisse Gallery, which existed until his death in 1989, became an influential part of the Modern Art movement in America. Matisse represented and exhibited many European artists and a few Americans and Canadians in New York, often for the first time. Matisse exhibited Joan Miró, Marc Chagall, Alberto Giacometti, Jean Dubuffet, André Derain, Yves Tanguy, Le Corbusier, Paul Delvaux, Wifredo Lam, Jean-Paul Riopelle, Balthus, Leonora Carrington, Zao Wou Ki, Sam Francis, and Simon Hantaï; sculptors Theodore Roszak, Raymond Mason, and Reg Butler; and several other important artists, including Henri Matisse. His art sales included ancient wares, such as the 1937 sale of an ancient Olmec statuette to the Wadsworth Atheneum in Hartford, Connecticut.

Personal life
Matisse was married three times. His first marriage, to Alexina "Teeny" Sattler (later Alexina Duchamp), produced three children: Paul Matisse, a painter/inventor; Jacqueline, and Peter. In 1949 the couple separated and Matisse married Patricia Kane Matta, the former wife of surrealist painter Roberto Matta. They were married until her death in 1972. In 1974, Matisse married Countess Maria-Gaetana "Tana" Matisse, the daughter of German diplomat Count Karl von Spreti. They remained married until his death on August 10, 1989, in Monaco. He was interred in Saint-Jean-Cap-Ferrat, France.

References

Sources
 Hilary Spurling. The Unknown Matisse: A Life of Henri Matisse, Vol. 1, 1869–1908. London, Hamish Hamilton Ltd, 1998. .
 Hilary Spurling. Matisse the Master: A Life of Henri Matisse, Vol. 2, The Conquest of Colour 1909–1954. London, Hamish Hamilton Ltd, 2005. .
 John Russell, Matisse, Father & Son, published by Harry N. Abrams, NYC. Copyright John Russell 1999,

External links
Metropolitan Museum of Art, Special Exhibitions, retrieved January 3, 2008
Morgan Library and Museum, Pierre Matisse and His Artists, retrieved January 3, 2008
"When a Son of Matisse Courted a Godfather", by John Russell, New York Times, retrieved May 26, 2008
The Pierre and Tana Matisse Foundation

1900 births
1989 deaths
American art collectors
French art collectors
American art dealers
French art dealers
Henri Matisse
Pierre
French emigrants to the United States